The Bothnian Sea links the Bothnian Bay (also called the Bay of Bothnia) with the Baltic proper. Kvarken is situated between the two. Together, the Bothnian Sea and Bay make up a larger geographical entity, the Gulf of Bothnia, where the Bothnian Sea is the southern part. The whole Gulf of Bothnia is situated between Sweden, to the west, Finland, to the east, and the Sea of Åland and Archipelago Sea to the south. The largest coastal towns, from south to north, are Rauma and Pori in Finland, and Gävle and Sundsvall in Sweden. Umeå (Sweden) and Vaasa (Finland) lie in the extreme north, near Bothnian Bay.

See also 
 Bothnian Sea National Park

References

External links 
 

Baltic Sea
Gulfs of Sweden
Bodies of water of Finland
Bothnia
Gulf of Bothnia
Landforms of Västerbotten County
Landforms of Västernorrland County
Landforms of Gävleborg County